Volume 6 is the sixth album by Banda Calypso, released in 2004. The album features a very sentimental content with much of romantic ballads, was not very danceable rhythms like Cumbia or Merengue, but did not miss the dance musicality that was ever brought. The disc is one of the classics of the band until today that is A Lua Me Traiu, and some highlights like the songs Ainda Te Amo, Pra Todo Mundo ver,  and the song Minha Princesa which was dedicated to Yasmin who was born shortly before the signal for disc burning music brings her crying before the last chorus.

Release 
Soon after the birth of Yasmin the band enters the studio for the production of the sixth album, which was released shortly before the recording of the show in Manaus that would lead to the second DVD the band. Thus, the band bet on living with a studio album and a live album market.

Reception 
Even with two albums released in upcoming dates, Volume 6 was among the 10 discs more sold for several weeks in different regions of the country, with over 950,000 copies sold at the end of 2005, thus obtaining records of gold, platinum, diamond and double diamond.

Criticism 
Many criticisms have been made as a quieter drive great romantic part tranzendo more excitement turned out to new fans and bring a different job. On the other hand, there were the fans who had a preference for more dance songs, and ended up being criticized as a disc without rhythm, without much diversity.

Tracks
"A Lua Me Traiu" - 3:55
"Se Quebrou" - 3:31
"Pra Todo Mundo Ver" - 3:38
"Você Me Enganou" - 3:21
"Lágrimas de Amor" - 3:12
"Ainda Te Amo" - 3:28
"Beija-Flor" - 3:22
"Anjo Bandido" - 3:39
"Tudo de Novo" - 3:25
"Fora de Controle" - 4:07
"Minha Princesa" - 4:13
"Deixa Eu Sonhar" - 3:47
"Bye, Bye, My Love" - 4:21

Chart performance

References

2004 albums
Banda Calypso albums